The Battle of Ichi was fought on August 14, 1592, in Jeolla Province during the Japanese invasions of Korea. Kwon Yul and Hwang Jin's one-thousand-man army battled against the two-thousand-man army of Kobayakawa Takakage. The Koreans won this battle and stopped the Japanese army from advancing to Jeolla Province.

Background 
Toyotomi Hideyoshi made an order to Kobayakawa Takakage to attack the Jeolla Province. Jeolla Province was famous for it rice, and Japan needed that rice to feed their army. Also, Admiral Yi Sun-sin's naval force was stationed in Jeolla Province. Capturing Jeolla Province would provide a land route for the Japanese army to attack Admiral Yi, who had interfered with Japanese supply lines for the past two months. So Kobayakawa, who was in Seoul at the time, advanced to attack the Korean army.

Flow of the battle 
Japanese army needed to go from Geumsan County to Jeonju to capture the province. There were two paths that the Japanese could take. One path was blocked by a hill called Ungchi and the other was blocked by Ichi hill. The Japanese split their forces and so did the Koreans. So the battle for Ichi and Ungchi happened at the same time. At the same time, Ko Kyong-myong was advancing to Geumsan to try to trap the Japanese. Although force at Ichi were winning by the 8th, Korean force at Ungchi routed to Jeonju at that time and the Japanese force advanced to Jeonju by that path. However, later on, Japanese force retreated from Ichi and Jeonju. Ko Kyong-myong force has arrived and was attacking the Japanese rear. As a result, Japan failed to provide enough rice for its army, which affected its ability to fight.

Japanese invasions of Korea (1592–1598)